The Sharp PC-1350 is a small pocket computer manufactured by Sharp. The PC-1350 was introduced in 1984 and was used by engineers, and favored by programmers for its programming and graphical capabilities. It was superseded in 1987 by the PC-1360, which featured one additional RAM expansion port, improved BASIC, floppy disk capability, and a faster CPU.

Technical specifications
Listed below are the technical specification of the PC-1350 and PC-1360 models.
 CMOS 8-bit CPU SC61860 at 768 kHz
 24x4 character (150x32 pixels) LCD controlled by SC43537 display LSI chip
 4 KiB RAM on 2x HM6116 chip
 40 KiB System ROM (8 KiB CPU internal, 32 KiB external on SC613256 chip)
 Integrated piezo speaker (beep only)
 I/O Sharp custom interfaces for printers and tape recorders
 I/O RS-232 at TTL level
 Powered by two CR-2032 lithium batteries (consumption max. 5 mA during arithmetical computing, 20 uA during poweroff)
 Built-in BASIC interpreter
 RAM expansion port, for up to 20 KiB of RAM in total.

See also 
 Sharp pocket computer character sets

References

External links 
 Images of a PC-1350 and a short description of functionality.
 PC-1350 Service manual.
 PC-1350 Mame / Emma / Mess emulator page.
 PC-1350 Memory map

PC-1350
PC-1350